Young Love is a collaborative studio album by American country artists Connie Smith and Nat Stuckey. It was released in July 1969 via RCA Victor and contained 12 tracks. The project was a collection of duets between Smith and Stuckey. The duets were mostly cover versions of songs previously recorded by other country artists. Many of these songs had originally been released as duets themselves. Included on the project was the pair's cover of "Young Love", which became a top 20 single on the American country songs chart. In 1969, Billboard gave the album a favorable response.

Background
In 1964, Connie Smith's debut single titled "Once a Day" topped the American country songs chart for eight weeks. It set forth a series of uninterrupted top ten country singles during the decade. In 1966, Nat Stuckey's single titled "Sweet Thang" reached the top five of the American country chart and had several more hit singles with "Plastic Saddle" and "Sweet Thang and Cisco". The decision to pair both country artists' voices was by their producers at RCA Victor. Smith's producer (Bob Ferguson) and Stuckey's producer (Felton Jarvis) believed "that their voices would blend well", according to biographer Barry Mazor. Smith herself described the duet pairing as "a four-way deal" because all four people were choosing material.

Recording and content
The recording process for Young Love took place over four different studio sessions between April 2 and April 30, 1969. Three songs were recorded per session and all were cut as duets between Smith and Stuckey. The sessions were co-produced by Bob Ferguson and Felton Jarvis at the RCA Victor Studio located in Nashville, Tennessee. The album contained a total of 12 tracks. Included was one song composed by Stuckey himself called "Two Together". Most of the album contained cover versions of songs first recorded by other country artists. Many of these covers were originally duets as well. One of these duet covers was "Yours Love", which had been released as a single by Dolly Parton and Porter Wagoner. Another duet cover was "Rings of Gold", which had been a top ten country single for Don Gibson and Dottie West. "I Got You" had also been a recent top ten single, but instead recorded by Anita Carter and Waylon Jennings.

Many of the album's remaining tracks were covers first recorded by solo artists. Among these was "I'll Share My World with You", which was a number two single for George Jones in 1969. Also featured as a cover of the number one country and pop single by Sonny James called "Young Love". Actor Tab Hunter would release his own version as a pop single as well. "Something Pretty" had been a top 20 country song for Wynn Stewart in 1968. "Let It Be Me" had first been a pop hit for The Everly Brothers but was revitalized as a duet between Glen Campbell and Bobbie Gentry in 1969. Also included on the album was a cover of the gospel song "Whispering Hope".

Release and reception

Young Love was originally released by the RCA Victor label in July 1969. It became Connie Smith's thirteenth studio album and Stuckey's sixth in their careers respectively. The original disc was issued as a vinyl LP, containing six songs on either side of the record. Decades later, Sony Music Entertainment re-released the album to digital and streaming sites including Apple Music. In their August 1969 issue, Billboard magazine gave Young Love a positive review. "Here are some great duets–an honored song format in the country field," the publication wrote. "Album is a must for dealers." AllMusic would later give the album a three out of five star rating. In its original release, Young Love spent ten weeks on the American Billboard Top Country Albums chart, peaking at the number 29 position in August 1969. The only single included on the disc was the duo's cover of "Young Love", which RCA Victor first released in June 1969. The song spent 11 weeks on the Billboard Hot Country Songs chart, peaking at number 20 by August.

Track listings

Vinyl version

Digital version

Personnel
All credits are adapted from the liner notes of Young Love and the biography booklet by Barry Mazor titled Just for What I Am.

Musical personnel
 Chet Atkins – guitar
 Joseph Babcock – background vocals
 David Briggs – piano
 Jerry Carrigan – drums
 Fred Carter Jr. – electric guitar
 Ray Edenton – rhythm guitar
 Dolores Edgin – background vocals
 Bobby Dyson – bass
 Roy Huskey – bass
 James Isbell – drums 

 Charlie McCoy – guitar, vives
 Weldon Myrick – steel guitar, leader
 June Page – background vocals
 Connie Smith – lead vocals
 Nat Stuckey – lead vocals
 Pete Wade – dobro
 Lamar Watkins – electric guitar
 Hurshel Wiginton – background vocals
 Chip Young – rhythm guitar
 Bill Walker – vibes

Technical personnel
 Bob Ferguson – Producer
 Felton Jarvis – Producer
 Al Pachucki – Engineer

Chart performance

Release history

References

Footnotes

Books

 

1969 albums
Albums produced by Bob Ferguson (music)
Albums produced by Felton Jarvis
Connie Smith albums
Nat Stuckey albums
RCA Records albums
Vocal duet albums